Atlas is a primarily male name usually given in reference to the character from Greek mythology. It has increased in usage in recent years for both boys and girls in the United States along with other mythological names, but is still more used for boys. There were 187 American girls given the name in 2021 compared with 2,523 American boys in the same year.   The name has also recently increased in usage for boys in the United Kingdom and Turkey.  It is also a primarily Ashkenazi Jewish surname derived from an Arabic word meaning satin.   An atlas is also a book with a collection of maps.

People with the given name
 Atlas (graffiti artist), American graffiti artist 
 Atlas DaBone, American wrestler and football player

People with the surname
 Charles Atlas (1892–1972), Italian-American bodybuilder
 Charles Atlas (artist)
 David Atlas (born 1924), American meteorologist who pioneered weather radar
 James Atlas (1949-2019), American writer, editor and publisher
 Meir Atlas (1848–1926), Lithuanian rabbi
 Natacha Atlas (born 1964), Belgian singer
 Nava Atlas, American book artist and author
 Omar Atlas (born 1938), former Venezuelan professional wrestler
 Scott Atlas (born 1955), American conservative health care policy advisor
 Teddy Atlas (born 1956), American boxing trainer and commentator
 Tony Atlas (born 1954), American wrestler and bodybuilder

Notes

Given names of Greek language origin